Crassula perforata is a succulent plant native to the Cape Provinces and KwaZulu-Natal in South Africa.

Description
C. perforata grows long, unbranched, rambling stems. It looks similar to its close relative, Crassula rupestris, but C. perforata has a long inflorescence, with many tiny cream flowers, and it flowers between November and April. (Crassula rupestris has a dense and rounded inflorescence that has leaf-like bracts at its base, and it flowers between June and October).

Distribution
C. perforata occurs in thicket vegetation and rocky slopes, from near Worcester in the west, to as far east as central KwaZulu-Natal.

References

perforata
Flora of the Cape Provinces
Flora of KwaZulu-Natal